The 2018 Setmana Ciclista Valenciana was a women's cycle stage race that was held in Spain from 22 to 25 February, 2018. The 2018 edition of the race was the second edition of the Setmana Ciclista Valenciana.

The race was won by British rider Hannah Barnes, riding for the  team, taking two stage victories during the event.

In the other classifications, Moolman won the polka-dot jersey for winning the mountains classification, while Cristina Martínez won the yellow jersey for top rider from the Valencian Community. Other jerseys were won by Belle De Gast (mountains for ) and Abby-Mae Parkinson (young rider for ), while  won the teams classification, placing Barnes, Pauline Ferrand-Prévot and Katarzyna Niewiadoma in the top-ten overall.

Teams
29 teams participated in the 2018 Setmana Ciclista Valenciana.

Route

Stages

Stage 1
22 February 2018 — Ròtova to Gandia,

Stage 2
23 February 2018 — Castellón de la Plana to Villarreal,

Stage 3
24 February 2018 — Sagunto to Valencia,

Stage 4
25 February 2018 — Benidorm to Benidorm,

Classification leadership table

References

External links

2018 in Spanish road cycling
February 2018 sports events in Spain
2018 in women's road cycling
2018 in the Valencian Community